Lewis John Wynford Vaughan-Thomas (né Thomas)  (15 August 1908 – 4 February 1987) was a Welsh newspaper journalist and radio and television broadcaster. In later life he took the name Vaughan-Thomas after his father.

Early life and education
Thomas was born in Swansea, in South Wales, the second son of Dr. David Vaughan Thomas, a Professor of Music, and Morfydd Lewis, the daughter of Daniel Lewis who was one of the leaders of the Rebecca Riots in Pontarddulais.

He attended the Bishop Gore School, Swansea, where the English master was the father of Dylan Thomas, who was just entering the school at the time that Vaughan-Thomas was leaving for Exeter College, Oxford. At Oxford he read modern history and gained a second class academic degree.

Career

BBC
In the mid-1930s, Vaughan-Thomas joined the BBC and, in 1937, gave the Welsh-language commentary on the coronation of King George VI and Queen Elizabeth. This was the precursor to several English-language commentaries on state occasions he was to give after the Second World War. During the war, he established his name and reputation as one of the BBC's most distinguished war correspondents. His most memorable report was from an RAF Lancaster bomber during a real bombing raid over Nazi Berlin. Other notable reports were from the Battle of Anzio, the Burgundy vineyards, Lord Haw-Haw's broadcasting studio and the Belsen concentration camp.

In 1953, he was one of a team of BBC commentators on the coronation of Queen Elizabeth II. He commentated on the funeral of his fellow wartime BBC correspondent Richard Dimbleby in 1965.

Harlech Television
In 1967, after leaving the BBC, Vaughan-Thomas was one of the founders of Harlech Television (HTV, now ITV Wales), being appointed director of programmes. As a frequent TV broadcaster himself throughout his early career with the BBC, he had adopted the required BBC accent of the time, but employed his more natural native Welsh accent to even better effect in his later career. 

In 1985, Vaughan-Thomas notably presented the 13-part series The Dragon Has Two Tongues with Gwyn Alf Williams. The series saw lengthy and often passionate discussions on Welsh history, with the two presenters representing opposing points of view, Williams being a Marxist historian and Vaughan-Thomas being described by Geraint H. Jenkins as his "affable Whiggish co-presenter".

Writing
Vaughan-Thomas wrote numerous books, many on Wales and a favourite subject of his, the Welsh countryside. 

His wartime overview and experiences, and his successful broadcasting career later, enabled him to view life and its vagaries with what he called "pointless optimism" — a perspective that served him.

His 1961 book Anzio was adapted as the 1968 Italian-American film Anzio, about the Battle of Anzio, the Allied seaborne assault on the Italian port of Anzio south of Rome during the Second World War.

Heritage
In May 1970, when president of the Council for the Protection of Rural Wales, Vaughan-Thomas officially opened the Pembrokeshire Coast Path in the Pembrokeshire Coast National Park at its southern end, at Amroth.

Private life
In 1946, Thomas married Charlotte Rowlands.

Honours
He was appointed Officer of the Order of the British Empire (OBE) in the 1974 Birthday Honours for services to Wales, and promoted Commander (CBE) in the 1986 Birthday Honours for services to Welsh culture.

He died in Fishguard, Pembrokeshire, on 4 February 1987, aged 78.

Memorial

A memorial was constructed after his death, completed and unveiled in 1990 at Cadair viewpoint, near Aberhosan (at ), in the form of a toposcope looking out over the rolling hills and mountains of Wales, with a depiction of Vaughan-Thomas pointing towards Snowdon, Wales' highest peak, which is just visible on a clear day.

Works 
 Anzio (1961)
 Madly in All Directions (1967)
 The Shell Guide to Wales (1969, with Alun Llewellyn)
 Portrait of Gower (1976)
 Great Little Trains Of Wales (1976)
 Trust to Talk (1980)
 Wynford Vaughan-Thomas's Wales (1981)
 Princes of Wales (1982)
 The Countryside Companion (1983)
 Dalgety (1984)
 Wales: a History (1985)
 How I Liberated Burgundy: And Other Vinous Adventures (1985)

References

Further reading
 – autobiography

External links 

 BBC Wales History
 BBC Cymru
 Thames Television Interview from 1972
 Wynford Vaughan-Thomas Papers at the National Library of Wales

1908 births
1987 deaths
Welsh-language television presenters
Welsh-speaking journalists
British male journalists
People from Swansea
People educated at Bishop Gore School
Alumni of Exeter College, Oxford
Welsh journalists
Welsh radio presenters
Welsh television presenters
BBC newsreaders and journalists
Commanders of the Order of the British Empire
20th-century British writers
20th-century British male writers